The Storm on the Stock Exchange was a violent attack on the Børsen in Copenhagen on 11 February 1918. The attack was organized by unemployed syndicalists.

Background
The background was the great inequality in society, which was intensified during World War I. There was high unemployment, rationing, housing shortages and lack of fuel, and the unemployed received little support. At the same time, speculators could make huge sums of money. Denmark was neutral and exported food to Germany with great profits. During 1918, the syndicalists were behind a series of unemployment demonstrations. The first unemployment demonstration under syndicalist leadership took place on January 29, 1918 and went from Grønttorvet to the Riksdag in Fredericiagade. According to Solidaritet, 35,000-40,000 took part in this demonstration, and although this number may be exaggerated, the demonstration was undoubtedly large.

The Storm
The storm took place on Shrove Monday 1918 and started from two meetings in Folkets Hus on Jagtvej 69 and Arbejdernes Forsamlingsbygning in Rømersgade. Only the leaders knew where the demonstration procession was going, and to fool the police, they leaked that the target was the Pork Hall, which was to be looted. The demonstration was led by the syndicalists Andreas Fritzner, Poul Gissemann and Alfred Mogensen, and it ended with a spontaneous storm on the Stock Exchange. The participants were armed with clubs, and they walked into the Stock Exchange and attacked the stockbrokers. Later, they attacked the police with rubble from the construction site to the third Christiansborg.

The attack was organized by, among others:
Andreas Fritzner, from the Trade Union Opposition Association and Young Socialist Association (USF).
Poul Gissemann from the Trade Union Opposition Association
Jørgen Mortensen from the Young Socialist Association
Christian Christensen from Trade Union Opposition Association

The leaders were punished with fines of 500 kroner, what Andreas Fritzner called "a ridiculously small Punishment". Five others received sentences ranging from 120 days to two years in prison.

Reactions and further processes
The storm on the Stock Exchange made a great impression on the contemporaries and especially bourgeois politicians and media distanced themselves from the revolutionaries. Illustreret Tidende compared the storm with the ravages of the Red Army and looting in the Finnish Civil War, which was at its height, and added: "On the 259th anniversary of the assault on Copenhagen, we experienced the Danish storm on the stock exchange. It is truly time that the bourgeoisie again awakens."

After the storm on the Stock Exchange, the syndicalists formed the Organization of the Unemployed (D.A.O.) which received great support. The syndicalists' struggle for the conditions and rights of the unemployed culminated in November 1918. The syndicalists had convened a protest meeting on 10 November at Grønttorvet, which gathered 50,000 participants, and again on 13 November, where 30,000-40,000 participated. The meeting on 13 November developed into violent clashes when the police attacked after the end of the meeting, and this was repeated on 14 November, when a large group of protesters gathered again on Grønttorvet. These events later became known as the "battles on Grønttorvet". In the years after the Storm on the Stock Exchange, the syndicalist movement gained growing support. Danish syndicalists were characterized by great optimism and a belief that the Russian Revolution had heralded the world revolution, whose realization was in full swing in Germany, Finland, Hungary and other European countries. On the domestic front, the syndicalist movement was successful and the syndicalist methods yielded visible results. The syndicalists played a not insignificant role in the many wildcat strikes that helped raise real wages, they had much of the credit for the 8-hour working day and experienced a breakthrough in relation to the principle of non-voting in the trade union movement (a struggle won by the syndicalists despite social democratic opposition). At this point, the movement was at its peak both in terms of membership numbers and influence. The Danish syndicalists, despite the movement's small membership, gained an influence that far exceeded what their size justified them to, and their ideas and fighting techniques reached far beyond their own membership. Thus syndicalism came to play a not insignificant role in the labor movement during the period of 1917 to 1921.

The decline of the Danish syndicalist movement began in 1921, when the political and economic power relations had completely changed compared to the situation in previous years; all attempts at revolution in Europe had been thwarted except in Russia, and the very optimistic expectations of an impending world revolution rapidly declined. On the domestic scene, the syndicalists did not succeed either, as the employers launched a powerful counter-offensive which during 1920-21 changed the balance of power in the labor market and inflicted some major defeats on the workers, which hit the syndicalists particularly hard.

References

External links 
 Rigsarkivet: Udtagne sager J. Den ungsocialistiske og syndikalistiske bevægelse 1903-1919
 Andreas Fritzners egen beretning i det socialistiske leksikon.org
 102 års oprør, Ungern Avis, Ungdomshuset, dec. 1999 (archive.org)
 Albert Scherfig, Arbejderbevægelsens Arkiv & Bibliotek Arbejderhistoriske Temaer: Stormen på Børsen 1918 (bl.a. Tidslinje), 2018
 Nicklas Damkjær & Albert Scherfig: 11. februar 1918: Da arbejdsløse stormede Børsen, Dagbladet Information, 10. feb. 2018
 Lasse Bertelsen: Revolutionære Bølger, Socialistisk Standpunkt, 13.4.2003
 Daniell Marcussen: Da syndikalisterne mødte Lenin..., Speciale, Historie, (Kandidatuddannelse), Aalborg Universitet 2009
 Københavns Historie. Bind 5 – Under fælles ansvar. 1900-1945 af Sv. Cedergreen Bech mfl. Gyldendalske Boghandel 1981. 
 StormenPåBørsen.dk (bl.a. Kildepakker)

1918 in Copenhagen
1918 in Denmark
Anarchism in Denmark
Anarcho-syndicalism
History of Copenhagen